Record Of Yoga is Sri Aurobindo's personal record of his yogic practice during the period from 1909 to 1927. A difficult and often cryptic text, it has only recently been published. In 1977, the editors of the project published a revised and corrected edition of Sri Aurobindo's Complete Works and started the journal Sri Aurobindo: Archives and Research in which over the next 18 years they published more than 2,000 pages of newly discovered writings, including most of the Record of Yoga. This was published in two volumes in 2002. Because of Aurobindo's extensive use of Sanskrit terminology, a glossary was also compiled and made available free online.

Record of Yoga was recommended by Michael Murphy for those interested in understanding Sri Aurobindo.

References 
 Sri Aurobindo, Record Of Yoga, Volume I, 777pp,  (soft cover)  (hard cover); Volume II, 728pp,  (hard cover), Sri Aurobindo Ashram Press, Pondicherry
 Publishing Sri Aurobindo's Complete Works

External links
 Glossary to the Record of Yoga

Works by Sri Aurobindo
Classic yoga books